The University System of Taipei (USTP) is a university alliance in Taiwan. Its constituents are:
National Taipei University (NTPU)
National Taipei University of Technology (NTUT)
Taipei Medical University (TMU)
National Taiwan Ocean University (NTOU)

Rankings

See also
List of universities in Taiwan
University alliances in Taiwan
University System of Taiwan
Taiwan Comprehensive University System
National University System of Taiwan
ELECT
European Union Centre in Taiwan

References

University systems in Taiwan